Poland competed at the 1992 Summer Olympics in Barcelona, Spain. 201 competitors, 149 men and 52 women, took part in 136 events in 21 sports.

Medalists

Competitors
The following is the list of number of competitors in the Games.

Archery

Poland entered three women and three men in its fifth appearance in Olympic archery.  Poland's women's archery program was much stronger, qualifying two archers for the elimination round and even winning a match while the men all fell short of the cutoff for advancing.  The men's team scored better in the team round, however, placing 10th as opposed to the women's team's 16th.

Men

Women

Athletics

Men
Track & road events

Field events

Women
Track & road events

Field events

Combined events – Heptathlon

Badminton

Boxing

Men

Canoeing

Slalom

Sprint
Men

Women

Cycling

Nine cyclists, all men, represented Poland in 1992.

Road

Track
Time trial

Pursuit

Points race

Diving

Men

Equestrian

Eventing

Fencing

20 fencers, 15 men and 5 women represented Poland in 1992.

Men

Individual

Team

Women

Individual

Team

Football

Men's tournament

Roster

Coach: Janusz Wójcik

Dariusz Adamczuk
Marek Bajor
Jerzy Brzęczek
Dariusz Gęsior
Marcin Jałocha
Andrzej Juskowiak
Aleksander Kłak

Andrzej Kobylański
Dariusz Koseła
Wojciech Kowalczyk
Marek Koźmiński
Tomasz Łapiński
Grzegorz Mielcarski
Arkadiusz Onyszko

Ryszard Staniek
Dariusz Szubert
Piotr Świerczewski
Mirosław Waligóra
Tomasz Wieszczycki
Tomasz Wałdoch

Group play

Group A

Quarter-finals

Semi-finals

Gold medal match

Gymnastics

Rhythmic Gymnastics

Judo

Men

Women

Modern pentathlon

Three male pentathletes represented Poland in 1992. They won gold in the team event and Arkadiusz Skrzypaszek won an individual gold too.

Rowing

Men

Sailing

Men

Women

Shooting

Men

Women

Open

Swimming

Men

Women

Table tennis

Tennis

Women

Weightlifting

Men

Wrestling

Men's freestyle

Men's Greco-Roman

References

Nations at the 1992 Summer Olympics
1992
1992 in Polish sport